Curtis Wright IV (born 1949) is an American former government official known for his role in the Food and Drug Administration's approval of OxyContin for Purdue Pharma in 1995, followed by his subsequent employment by the company, which led to portrayals in films and reports in nonfiction books, magazines, and news media outlets of his alleged role as one of the key figures in the current opioid epidemic in the United States. Wright was implicated in a criminal conspiracy outlined in a 2006 United States Department of Justice review document that was first made public in Purdue Pharma's 2019 bankruptcy proceedings. Although that case was settled in a 2007 plea agreement deal, members of United States Congress have requested the full 2006 documentation from the Department of Justice with the goal of opening a new case based upon the evidence then gathered. Parts of Wright's sworn depositions in 2003 and 2018 have internal contradictions and differ from documentary evidence described the 2003–2006 U.S. Federal Government investigation into Purdue Pharma.

Early life and education
Wright was born in 1949. His father was an Ivy League-educated university law professor, and his mother was a psychiatrist and the superintendent of a state mental hospital. Wright received a bachelor's degree in chemistry from Haverford College. He finished a four-year program of medicine in 1977 at George Washington University School of Medicine & Health Sciences prior to joining the United States Navy as a lieutenant. Wright completed his surgical internship at the Naval Regional Medical Center in Portsmouth, Virginia in 1978, where he received training in undersea medicine and substance abuse treatment. By 1983, Wright had attained the rank of lieutenant commander in the United States Navy. He received a master's degree in public health from the Johns Hopkins School of Hygiene and Public Health in 1986, where he also completed his residency the following year. This followed with a residency in occupational and general preventative medicine and a fellowship in behavioral pharmacology and drug dependence. Wright's training program in behavioral pharmacology was funded by the National Institute on Drug Abuse. He completed his postgraduate in behavioral pharmacology from Johns Hopkins University School of Medicine in 1989.

Career 
Wright continued in academia from 1993 to 2000 as an assistant professor at the Uniformed Services University of the Health Sciences, and from 2006 as an adjunct clinical instructor at Tufts University School of Medicine.

Wright's first government job after receiving his bachelor's degree at Haverford in the 1970s was as a research chemist for the National Institute of Mental Health, a U.S. governmental agency responsible for biomedical and health-related research. After leaving the United States Navy, Wright joined the Food and Drug Administration in December 1989 and by late 1996 had attained his highest position as acting director of its Division of Anesthetic, Critical Care, and Addiction of Drug Products. This FDA department was responsible for protecting and promoting public health through the control and supervision of prescription pharmaceutical drugs. Under Wright's tenure, Purdue Pharma's application to sell the opioid OxyContin was approved and included specific wording in the prescription information that allowed the company broader scope in marketing the opioid as less addictive, and therefore suitable for a wider range of patient pain than any previously FDA-approved opioids of similar strength. Wright left the FDA in October 1997.

Wright's first private sector job after leaving the FDA was with Adolor Corporation, a pharmaceutical company that was eventually acquired by Pfizer. In December 1998, he was hired by Purdue Pharma and eventually attained the position of executive director for Risk Assessment and Health Policy. After leaving Purdue, Wright joined Javelin Pharmaceuticals Inc. in September 2005 as vice president of risk management and regulatory affairs. According to documents of the Securities and Exchange Commission, from 2008 Wright was an executive officer and shareholder in a company called Star Scientific Inc. After the company founder's involvement in a 2014 gifts corruption scandal that resulted in the conviction (later overturned) of Virginia governor Bob McDonnell, the company changed its name to Rock Creek Pharmaceuticals, filing bankruptcy two years later. One month after the federal indictment of McDonnell, Wright formed a pharmaceutical consulting company under his own name in Gloucester, Massachusetts. The company was dissolved in 2018, either under a court order or by order of the secretary of the Commonwealth of Massachusetts.

In government legal documents 
On December 3, 2002, U.S. Attorney John L. Brownlee, who headed the United States District Court for the Western District of Virginia, subpoenaed Purdue Pharma for their corporate records relating to OxyContin, consisting of millions of pages. With the help of Brownlee's assistants Randy Ramsmeyer and Rick Mountcastle, the evidence, gathered into a 120-page prosecution memo from September 28, 2006, entitled Memorandum for the United States Attorney, was sent to the Department of Justice in Washington DC, where it was reviewed by U.S. Justice Fraud Division attorney Rick Ogrosky. After indicting Purdue Pharma and its executives Michael Friedman, Howard R. Udell, and Paul D. Goldenheim on felony charges of criminal misbranding in 2006, a plea deal was arranged by Purdue's attorneys, former U.S. Attorneys Rudy Giuliani and Mary Jo White in 2007 to instead charge Purdue Frederick, a minor subsidiary of the company, with a felony and reduce the charges against the three Purdue Pharma executives to misdemeanors. The plea deal was confirmed and ordered on July 23, 2007, by Chief U.S. District Judge James Parker Jones, and Purdue Frederick was sentenced to pay a fine of $600 million. The executives were given fines and made to perform community service in drug treatment programs. Purdue Pharma and its three executives were originally to be charged with the felony crimes of criminal conspiracy, mail fraud, wire fraud, interstate distribution of a misbranded drug, and two counts of money laundering. Since the case was concluded in a plea agreement and never went to trial, Brownlee's 2006 memorandum detailing the evidence for these charges was not released to the public and remains confidential. Rick Ogrosky's 2006 internal Department of Justice Fraud Division review of Brownlee's 2006 memo, however, was released to the public as part of Purdue Pharma's 2019 bankruptcy proceedings in the Southern District of New York and shows that the 2006 memo has numerous references to Wright. Ogrosky concludes that Wright colluded with Purdue to get approval for OxyContin with purposefully false label statements.

On July 25, 2003, Wright made a sworn deposition under oath for the U.S. District Court in the Northern District of Mississippi in the case of Terri Lynn Poston v. Purdue Pharma. At the time, Wright was an employee of Purdue Pharma. The deposition was conducted by the plaintiff's attorney, Robert J. McNamara. Purdue attorneys Donald I. Strauber and Jay R. Henneberry were present representing Wright and had coached him prior to the deposition. Richard Silbert from Purdue Pharma and Michael Shane from the FDA were also present. The deposition lasted for approximately seven and half hours, and the transcript consists 41 pages of two-column text.

As part of a class-action lawsuit in the U.S. District Court for the Northern District of Ohio, Eastern Division, Wright was deposed under oath on December 19, 2018, by the plaintiff's attorneys Linda Singer and Michael G. Stewart. Wright was represented by Purdue Pharma attorney Erik W. Snapp, although Wright had not worked for the company for over a decade. The deposition lasted over eight hours and the transcript consists of 80 pages of two-column text.

FDA meetings with Purdue Pharma 
Wright testified under oath in his 2003 Mississippi deposition that he had no documents from his time at the FDA related to communications with Purdue Pharma. He stated that he "never met individually with representatives of pharmaceutical firms. One of the requirements is that a consumer safety officer be present and the consumer safety officer was tasked with maintaining records of such things." In Wright's 2018 Ohio deposition, he stated he "simply never met with the company alone," meaning with Purdue, and when meeting, always had an FDA consumer safety officer present. In Ogrosky's 2006 Justice Department review of the prosecution memo, however, Purdue records show that Wright contacted Purdue in January 1995 and requested a private meeting without a consumer safety officer present. According to Purdue documents cited, Wright met from January 31 to February 2, 1995, with Purdue Pharma representatives in a hotel room near the FDA offices in Rockville, Maryland, and allowed the company to help draft his medical officer's review (MOR) of OxyContin for the FDA, which included approving the wording of certain texts to be used in OxyContin's package insert, or label. It was the specific wording of these texts that allowed Purdue to successfully market OxyContin as suitable for general cases of pain and as less addictive than other opioids.

FDA approvals for Purdue Pharma 
The first approved label for OxyContin contained the text "Delayed absorption, as provided by OxyContin tablets, is believed to reduce the abuse liability of a drug." This text was exploited by Purdue Pharma and was quoted in the 2007 felony conviction of the company for criminal misbranding. In Wright's 2003 Mississippi deposition, he stated that he didn't think such language would be used on any other controlled release opioid label, for the reason that Purdue was following Wright's request as an FDA official to "talk somehow about the abuse liability of their product instead of just oxycodone." Wright made the analogy that crack cocaine is to fast release opioids as standard cocaine is to controlled-release opioids such as OxyContin, with the latter having "lower liability" for abuse. As to the ambiguous text "is believed to reduce the abuse liability," Wright stated that no studies were performed, nor was it generally accepted, but that "believed" means "just that. It's believed. Might be a consensus belief, it might be an expert opinion. It's more than a conjecture, but if there is evidence, you usually make some statement that there is evidence." According to Wright, the sentence was included OxyContin's FDA-approved label as the result of "back and forth iterations between Purdue and the FDA." He didn't remember if Purdue requested the sentence, nor if he himself was its author, although he admitted he could have been. Wright further stated that he still at that time (2003) believed the statement to be true, despite there having been no clinical tests performed as to its veracity. Wright then stated that Purdue was "not comfortable" with the statement, suggesting that they only accepted it because of Wright's recommendation. In Wright's 2018 Ohio deposition, he stated that he didn't know who proposed the "delayed absorption" language in the FDA-approved label, though he again stated that he could have written it.

Hired by Purdue Pharma 
Wright left the FDA in October 1997 and was offered a position in October 1998 by Purdue Pharma. In his 2003 Mississippi deposition, Wright states that an unnamed job recruiter contacted him sometime after he left the FDA and offered to arrange a job interview for Wright with Purdue. Wright said he could only guess about the amount of his previous salary at the FDA as having been "somewhere between" $140,000 and $158,000 a year. Wright testified that his Purdue salary started at $185,000 a year and by the time of the deposition in 2003 was about $200,000 a year. According to Ogrosky's Department of Justice summary of the 2006 prosecution memo, Purdue records show Wright's starting compensation package at Purdue Pharma to have been in excess of $379,000. While employed by Purdue Pharma he was rewarded, in addition to his salary, 14 patents related to opioids, nine of them for inventions improving the efficacy of Oxycontin. On August 28, 2015, Richard Sackler, one of the owners and a former chairman and president of Purdue Pharma, testified in the Commonwealth of Kentucky v. Purdue Pharma trial. Sackler stated that Wright contacted them about possible employment while Wright was still employed by the FDA, but that Sackler discussed the matter with Paul Goldenheim and concluded Purdue should not immediately hire "someone who had reviewed our product and left" the FDA. According to Sackler's recollection of the events, Purdue waited "two or three years" before hiring Wright.

Predicting the opioid epidemic 
Wright spoke at a U.S. government symposium in 1999 that was subsequently published. His lecture warned that the widespread prescribing of opioids will lead directly to widespread addiction in the general population. At the time of this assessment, Wright was an employee of Purdue Pharma. This is a partial outtake of the lecture, quoted verbatim:

"Most physicians agree that iatrogenic addiction is an uncommon event in the clinical management of acute pain states, with an incidence of perhaps 1:10,000 patients treated. Being so uncommon, it is assumed to represent a negligible risk. This is a grave error. Iatrogenic addiction ceases to be a rare and negligible problem as soon as the size of the acute opioid analgesic market is taken into account. There are about 130 million prescriptions written for oral medications containing oxycodone, hydrocodone, hydromorphone and propoxyphene every year. If even 1 in ten thousand patients (1/10,000) a year develops de-novo addiction as the result of such treatment, this means 13,000 new addicts each year. Since the duration of addiction, especially to pharmaceuticals, may be as long as 10 years, an incidence rate of 13,000 will predict a prevalence of 130,000 addicts in the population."

"Acute exposure to opioids carries a very low risk, but is so common an event that it poses a significant public health problem. The street value (the amount a stranger in a bar will pay for a tablet) of diverted opioids is substantial, ranging from $1 up to $20 per tablet (prices vary depending on strength, desirability, and the current supply). Given that the cost of most common opioid analgesics is less than $0.50 a tablet, there is substantial profit in diversion and resale, at all levels (manufacturer, wholesaler, retail pharmacy, physician and patient). After alcohol, tobacco, inhalants and cannabis (the classic portal agents), oral dosage forms of pharmaceuticals are the most common agents for drug experimentation. They are attractive because they are easily identified, assumed safe (FDA approved!), and readily obtained in the illicit market."

On the opioid epidemic 
In November 2008, Wright co-authored an ostensibly scientific paper entitled "Risk Evaluation and Mitigation Strategies for Drugs with Abuse Liability: Public Interest, Special Interest, Conflicts of Interest, and the Industry Perspective." The paper relied heavily on data from the RADARS system, a program for tracking the abuse and diversion of pharmaceutical products founded by Purdue Pharma. They stated that RADAR studies showed that OxyContin abuse was "confined mostly to rural areas with long histories of prescription drug abuse, and that it was often part of a larger problem of prescription opioid and other drug and alcohol abuse." The authors further concluded that abuse and diversion problems stemmed from doctors overprescribing the drug and engaging in illicit trafficking, as well as pharmacy thefts. The solutions offered by Purdue Pharma were to assist law enforcement and to fund community programs for prevention and intervention. The article concluded "the OxyContin risk-management plan was a large, complex program suitable for a widely used drug prescribed in the outpatient family practitioner and general practitioner environment." The authors stated potential conflicts of interest: a Purdue Pharma employee, a Javelin Pharmaceuticals employee, and Wright, formerly employed by Purdue Pharma and at the time of writing by Javelin Pharmaceuticals.

In the media
Wright was played by actor Brian Keene in an episode of docudrama series Dopesick on Hulu. The scene alleges that Wright met with Richard Sackler and Purdue executives in 2001 to discuss how they could continue the Purdue marketing strategy for OxyContin despite the FDA's threat to give the drug a black box warning label. There is no known documentation for Wright's presence at that meeting, but according to Wright's 2018 Ohio deposition, he was not on the OxyContin team at the time and was only aware of any details of any such meetings if somebody asked him "some question." The 2021 two-part HBO documentary film The Crime of the Century featured an unknown actor playing Wright in a reenactment of Wright's alleged January 31 to February 2, 1995 secret meeting with Purdue representatives in a hotel room in Rockville, Maryland.

There are multiple pages discussing Wright's role in the FDA and Purdue Pharma in nonfiction books such as  Patrick Radden Keefe's Empire of Pain (2021),  Barry Meier's Pain Killer (2003, reprinted 2020), and Sam Quinones' Dreamland (2015). Articles in newspapers, magazines and other news outlets discussing Wright are too numerous to mention, but have featured in articles in The New York Times and HuffPost, to name a few.

In 2017, Wright consented to a brief interview in Esquire magazine about the Sackler family and Purdue Pharma roles in the opioid epidemic:

"At the time, it was believed that extended-release formulations were intrinsically less abusable. It came as a rather big shock to everybody—the government and Purdue—that people found ways to grind up, chew up, snort, dissolve, and inject the pills. In the mid-nineties, the very best pain specialists told the medical community they were not prescribing opioids enough. That was not something generated by Purdue—that was not a secret plan, that was not a plot, that was not a clever marketing ploy. Chronic pain is horrible. In the right circumstances, opioid therapy is nothing short of miraculous; you give people their lives back. No company in the history of pharmaceuticals has worked harder to try to prevent abuse of their product than Purdue."

References

Living people
1949 births
Food and Drug Administration people
Food and Drug Administration
Drug policy of the United States
Social problems in medicine
Opioid epidemic
Opioids in the United States